KPLO may refer to:

 KPLO-TV, a television station (channel 13 digital) licensed to Reliance, South Dakota, United States, rebroadcasting KELO-TV
 KPLO-FM, a radio station (94.5 FM) licensed to Reliance, South Dakota, United States
 Korea Pathfinder Lunar Orbiter, the first lunar exploration mission by the Korea Aerospace Research Institute.